Serratifusus sitanius is a species of sea snail, a marine gastropod mollusk in the family Buccinidae, the true whelks.

Description
The length of the shell attains 61.4 mm.

Distribution
This marine species occurs off New Caledonia (depth range: 600 -616 m).

References

 Fraussen, K.; Hadorn, R. (2003). Six new Buccinidae (Mollusca: Gastropoda) from New Caledonia. Novapex. 4(2-3): 33-50

External links

Buccinidae
Gastropods described in 2003